The R616 is a Regional Route in South Africa.

Route
Its western terminus is the R74 at Bergville. It initially runs north-north-east, then east to end at an intersection with the N11 and the N3 near Ladysmith.

References

Regional Routes in KwaZulu-Natal